Reimarochloa is a genus of New World plants in the grass family, native to North and South America including the Greater Antilles. Reimar grass is a common name for this genus.

 Species
 Reimarochloa aberrans (Döll) Chase - Bolivia, Brazil, French Guiana
 Reimarochloa acuta (Flüggé) Hitchc. - Honduras, El Salvador, Cuba, Hispaniola, the Guianas, Venezuela, Colombia, Peru, Bolivia, Brazil, Argentina, Paraguay
 Reimarochloa oligostachya (Munro ex Benth.) Hitchc. - United States (Alabama, Florida), Cuba, Mexico (Colima, Tabasco)

References

Poaceae genera
Grasses of North America
Grasses of South America
Taxa named by A. S. Hitchcock
Panicoideae